Genoplesium arrectum, commonly known as the erect midge orchid and as Corunastylis arrecta in Australia, is a small terrestrial orchid endemic to south-eastern Australia. It has a single thin leaf fused to the flowering stem and up to twenty small, dark purple flowers. It grows in a montane and subalpine grassland and forest in Victoria and the Australian Capital Territory.

Description
There is an narrow egg-shaped callus in the centre of the labellum and extending three-quarters of the way to its tip. Flowering occurs in December and January.

Taxonomy and naming
Genoplesium arrectum was first formally described in 1991 by David Jones from a specimen collected near Omeo and the description was published in Australian Orchid Research. In 2002 Jones and Mark Clements changed the name to Corunastylis arrecta. The specific epithet (arrecta) is a Latin word meaning "upright", referring to the stiffly erect lateral sepals.

Distribution and habitat
Genoplesium arrectum grows in grassland and grassy forest at altitudes above  in north-eastern Victoria and in the Australian Capital Territory.

References

External links
 
 

arrectum
Endemic orchids of Australia
Orchids of the Australian Capital Territory
Orchids of Victoria (Australia)
Plants described in 1991